Ronald Beagle (February 7, 1934 – September 8, 2015) was an American football end.

Beagle was born in Hartford, Connecticut but played high school football in Cincinnati. The 6 foot one inch, 185-pounder entered the United States Naval Academy in 1952.  A physical player, Beagle won All-America recognition in his junior and senior seasons during an era in which ends played 60 minutes. He was honored with the Maxwell Award after his junior year in 1954, in which he had 30 receptions, 451 yards rushing and four touchdowns to complement his stout defense. He finished his three-year career with 64 receptions for 849 yards (mostly from George Welsh) and eight touchdowns despite fighting through a broken hand.

He also was All-America in lacrosse.

Beagle was selected by the Chicago Cardinals in the 17th round of the 1956 NFL Draft, two picks before the Green Bay Packers took Bart Starr. Before he was to join the Cardinals, he served four years in the United States Marines. He suffered a knee injury while playing football in the service and was never able to recover. He went into business in Sacramento, California.

Beagle married a Navy nurse, Jo Ann Jones. Their daughter, Ronda J. Beagle, graduated from the Naval Academy in 1984. The Beagles were among the first families with a father and daughter who graduated from the academy. Ronda Beagle authored a 1993 book on the Navy's efforts to recruit women.

Uniquely in the history of the sport, Beagle and Roger Staubach played football for the same high school (Purcell in Cincinnati), played college ball at the same school (Navy), won the Maxwell Trophy, made All-America, and eventually were inducted into the College Football Hall of Fame, with Beagle receiving that honor in 1986.

References

External links
 

1934 births
2015 deaths
American football ends
Navy Midshipmen football players
Navy Midshipmen men's lacrosse players
All-American college football players
College Football Hall of Fame inductees
Maxwell Award winners
Sportspeople from Hartford, Connecticut
Players of American football from Cincinnati
Players of American football from Hartford, Connecticut